Geoffrey de Saye II (1155–1230), was the Lord of West Greenwich, and a Magna Carta surety. He owned land at Edmonton and Sawbridgeworth. His family bore the arms Quarterly, or and gules. 

Geoffrey de Saye II was born in 1155 in West Greenwich, Kent, England, the son of Geoffrey de Saye, Lord of West Greenwich (1135–1214). He died on 24 Aug 1230 in Gascoigne, Poitou, France.

He married Hawise de Clare.

References

General references 

1155 births
1230 deaths
Magna Carta barons
People from Edmonton, London
People from Sawbridgeworth
English feudal barons